The Sports Museum of America (SmA) was the United States' first national sports museum dedicated to the history and cultural significance of sports in America. It opened in May 2008 and closed less than nine months later, in February 2009.

The Sports Museum of America was the nation's first major museum incorporating most major sports. In addition to becoming the official home of the Heisman Trophy and its annual presentation, the museum also housed the first-ever Women's Sports Hall of Fame. Among its board of directors were Mario Andretti, Martina Navratilova, Joe Frazier, Bob Cousy, Billie Jean King, Paul Hornung, and fifty other Hall of Fame athletes.

The museum was located in Lower Manhattan at the end of the Canyon of Heroes, at 26 Broadway, across from Bowling Green, close to the Statue of Liberty and Ellis Island ferry, the Whitehall Terminal of the Staten Island Ferry, Wall Street, and the World Trade Center.

Overview and collection 
The Museum became the official home of the Heisman Trophy and the Women's Sports Foundation International Women's Sports Hall of Fame within the Billie Jean King International Women's Sports Center.

Other sports halls of fame and museums, including the National Baseball Hall of Fame, loaned numerous artifacts. Additional artifacts were secured via private collectors. 
The Sports Museum featured more than 20 original sports films, numerous interactive exhibits, with its 25,000-square-foot exhibition space housing more than 1,100 photographs and 800 artifacts. Individual objects included Michael Phelps' goggles, Dara Torres' swim cap, Sandy Koufax's 1963 Cy Young Award; the ball from Ty Cobb's 3,000th hit, Lou Gehrig's jersey, and the flag Jim Craig wrapped himself in after the U.S. Miracle on Ice during the 1980 Winter Olympics.

The event space on the second floor of the museum featured a mural tribute to sports by famed sports artist LeRoy Neiman. 

Tickets to the Sports Museum of America costs $27 for adults and $20 for children.

History

Concept and development 
Founder Philip Schwalb developed the concept in September 2001 following a visit to the Naismith Memorial Basketball Hall of Fame. The museum's plan was to celebrate all sports, and the Canyon of Heroes where New York City's famed ticker-tape parades originated was chosen as the location. 

The decision was made to be a commercial organization, rather than a non-profit as many museums are, due to a desire to participate in New York's post-9/11 Liberty bond financing program (available only to for-profit businesses). Ultimately the museum received support from the requisite government officials, most importantly in the form of Liberty bonds issued by the City and the State to support projects aiding in the revitalization of Lower Manhattan. Schwalb and co-founder Sameer Ahuja raised $93 million over a three-year period to finance the museum, which included the aforementioned $57 million in Liberty bonds, as well as $36 million in private funds.

To ensure the museum was collaborative, Schwalb and Ahuja struck agreements with sixty non-profit partners, including every major sports hall of fame in North America and every notable national sports governing body (e.g. USTA, USGA, U.S. Soccer, USA Hockey). They also secured over 200 private investors, primarily Wall Street executives, to finance the museum––getting them to agree to donate 2% of revenues to charity.

Opening ceremonies 
Nearly 100 hall of fame athletes attended the May 7, 2008, opening, with speakers including New York City Mayor Michael Bloomberg, Billie Jean King (speaking on behalf of the Women's Sports Foundation), Tony Dorsett (speaking on behalf of the Heisman Trophy), and New York Giants Super Bowl-winning quarterback, Eli Manning.

Challenges 
Although it received some recognition, including Nickelodeon's Parents' Pick Award for best museum in New York City for children, the museum failed to meet its projected attendance. Pre-opening projections were that one million people would visit during the first year; fewer than 125,000 actually attended. Surveys indicated that 95% of New Yorkers were unaware of its existence. The museum's low-traffic location, coupled with a lack of exterior signage on the nondescript entrance in the Standard Oil Building, added to the museum's relative anonymity.

Closure 
On February 20, 2009 – open less than a year – the museum closed its doors, citing low attendance and $6 million in cost overruns. Management blamed the recession and the related atmosphere in the Lower Manhattan/Wall Street area.

The final tally in overall monies devoted to the effort was $93 million. In March 2009, Schwab offered to sell the museum's collection for $5 million.

HP Newquist, founder of the National Guitar Museum — which has no permanent location — specifically cited the Sports Museum's poor showing in his decision not to locate the National Guitar Museum in New York.

Partners
In an effort to be truly national and collaborative in its representation of all sports, the Museum partnered with more than 60 sporting organizations throughout the United States, and the Hockey Hall of Fame in Toronto (with 30 of those signed up to participate during the concept phase). Exclusive partners included:

American Museum of Fly Fishing
College Football Hall of Fame
Companions in Courage Foundation
World Figure Skating Hall of Fame
Heisman Trophy
Herreshoff Marine Museum/America's Cup Hall of Fame
Hockey Hall of Fame
Indianapolis Motor Speedway
International Boxing Hall of Fame
International Bowling Museum and Hall of Fame
International Swimming Hall of Fame
International Tennis Hall of Fame
Jackie Robinson Foundation
Lacrosse Museum and National Hall of Fame
Museum of Yachting

NCAA Hall of Champions
Negro Leagues Baseball Museum
Naismith Memorial Basketball Hall of Fame
NASCAR
National Museum of Racing and Hall of Fame
National Soccer Hall of Fame
National Softball Hall of Fame
National Track and Field Hall of Fame
National Wrestling Hall of Fame
Pro Football Hall of Fame
Special Olympics
United States Bicycling Hall of Fame
United States Golf Association
United States Tennis Association

US Lacrosse
United States Olympic Committee
US Soccer
USA Basketball
USA Hockey
USA Football
USA Rugby
USA Softball & Amateur Softball Association
USA Swimming
USA Track & Field
USA Volleyball
USA Wrestling
Volleyball Hall of Fame
Women's Sports Foundation
World Golf Hall of Fame

References

2008 establishments in New York City
2009 disestablishments in New York (state)
Financial District, Manhattan
Halls of fame in New York City
Museums established in 2008
Museums disestablished in 2009
Defunct museums in New York City
Sports museums in New York City